Godert Alexander Gerard Philip, Baron van der Capellen (15 December 1778 – 10 April 1848) was a Dutch statesman from Utrecht.

History
Born in Utrecht, Netherlands, Van der Capellen was the son of a cavalry colonel Alexander Philip van der Capellen. In 1803, he married Jacoba Elisabeth van Tuyll van Serooskerken. He was made Prefect of Friesland in 1808 and soon thereafter Minister of the Interior and a member of the Privy Council. At his advice, King Louis Napoleon abdicated the throne in 1810 in favor of his son, Louis II. Van der Capellen did not serve Napoleon I.  Wilhelm I, King of the Netherlands, appointed him Colonial Minister and sent him as Secretary of United Kingdom of the Netherlands to Brussels.

In 1815, Van der Capellen was made one of the three Commissioners-General of the Dutch East Indies with Cornelis Theodorus Elout and Arnold Adriaan Buyskes, where he had to deal with both a native rebellion and a money shortage. In fact, during his tenure in Java, his power was largely ceremonial as his adjunct, Cornelis Theodorus Elout, had much of the actual power. The King decreed freedom of cultivation and trade, and the slave trade was prohibited. As Governor-General of the Dutch East Indies, Van der Capellen was less progressive than other commissioners; after they left in 1819, he increased the power of native chiefs.  He protected the Government's system of coffee plantations by not allowing European planters to settle in the Priangan area of West Java, nor would he let Europeans or Chinese trade there.

On 28 April 1822, he was made a Baron. In 1824 he cancelled contracts of land tenancy, forcing the native chiefs to pay back the advances they had received by further exploiting the cultivators.  This caused unrest in Yogyakarta.  As the post-war boom in coffee and sugar exports faded, Javanese ports went into deficit.  Money was spent quelling riots outside of Java in Maluku (Moluccas), Kalimantan (Borneo), Sulawesi (Celebes), Palembang, and on the west coast of Sumatra.  Van der Capellen made a tour in 1824 and abolished the hated limit on the number of spice trees.  Muntinghe's proposal for a national company under King Willem was adopted in 1825 as the Netherlands Trading Society with 37,000,000 guilders in capital and paying 4.5 percent dividends.  Hard-pressed cultivators had to pay taxes in money and turned to Chinese moneylenders.

He was ordered back in 1825 and named President of the Board of Trustees of the University of Utrecht in 1828.  In 1838, he attended the coronation of Queen Victoria in London as the Dutch envoy.  Van der Capellen then served as the Lord Chamberlain of King William II.  He died in April 1848 in De Bilt.

Notes

References
The Meyers Konversations-Lexikon
Wurtzburg, Charles Edward (1953). Raffles of the Eastern Isles. Oxford University Press.

External links 
 

1778 births
1848 deaths
Barons of the Netherlands
Governors-General of the Dutch East Indies
Ministers of Economic Affairs of the Netherlands
Ministers of Colonial Affairs of the Netherlands
Ministers of Religious Affairs of the Netherlands
Royal Netherlands East Indies Army generals
Royal Netherlands East Indies Army officers
Politicians from Utrecht (city)
Recipients of the Order of the Netherlands Lion
Knights of the Military Order of Max Joseph
Dutch military commanders of the Napoleonic Wars
Dutch civil servants
19th-century Dutch diplomats
Dutch members of the Dutch Reformed Church
19th-century Dutch East Indies people
People of the Kingdom of Holland